is Mai Kuraki's twenty-fifth single, released on December 20, 2006. The song was first unveiled on the last day of Kuraki's Live Tour 2006 Diamond Wave and premiered on radio on NBS's "Azuma Takahiro no Young Peace" November 30. "Shiroi Yuki" was her first single in five years (since "always") and was used as an ending theme for the long-running anime series Detective Conan.

Usage in media
 NTV anime "Meitantei Conan" ending theme (#1)

Track listing

Charts

Oricon sales chart

External links
Kuraki Mai Official Website 

2006 singles
2006 songs
Mai Kuraki songs
Giza Studio singles
Case Closed songs
Songs written by Aika Ohno
Songs written by Mai Kuraki
Song recordings produced by Daiko Nagato